Andrea Mancini (born 26 April 1996) is an Italian footballer who plays as a forward for SC Ligorna 1922 in Serie D.

He is the son of Felice Mancini, former footballer and currently a football coach. Felice coached Andrea in 2010–11 season.

Career

Pescara
In May 2013 Mancini received his first senior call-up against A.C. Milan from his former reserve team coach Cristian Bucchi. Before that match Pescara certainly relegated after just one season in Serie A. He substituted Emmanuel Cascione in the second half, at that time Mattia Perin, the keeper of Pescara already conceded 4 goals. He was the second youngest Serie A player of 2012–13 Serie A after Alberto Cerri, in terms of age of debut.

Mancini was a member of under-15 youth team of Pescara  in National Giovanissimi League in 2010–11 season. He was the member of Allievi U17 team from 2011 to 2013 season. He also played 10 games for the U19 team in Campionato Nazionale Primavera in 2012–13 season, skipping U18 team in Berretti League of the youth ladder. In 2013–14 season he was loaned to Serie A club Napoli, but only able to spend his career with the reserve team.

Mancini wore no. 27 for 2014–15 Serie B.

Vicenza (loan)
On 12 September 2014 he was loaned to Serie B newcomer Vicenza Calcio. He wore no.34 shirt for Vicenza.

L'Aquila (loan)
On 9 July 2015 L'Aquila signed Mancini, Nicholas Bensaja, Luca Savelloni and Adedoyin Sanni in temporary deals from Pescara .

References

External links

 AIC profile (data by football.it) 

1996 births
Sportspeople from Pescara
Footballers from Abruzzo
Living people
Italian footballers
Association football forwards
Delfino Pescara 1936 players
L.R. Vicenza players
L'Aquila Calcio 1927 players
Santarcangelo Calcio players
U.S. Ancona 1905 players
S.S. Teramo Calcio players
A.S.D. Francavilla players
Serie A players
Serie C players
Serie D players